The Artistic Conservatory of French Polynesia (ty: te fare upa rau est / fr: Conservatoire artistique de Polynésie française) or CAPF is a cultural organisation in French Polynesia whose goal is the conservation of the cultural heritage of French Polynesia. It was founded in 1979 by Maco Tevane and Claude Malric.

References

External links
 Official site

Cultural organizations based in French Polynesia
1979 establishments in French Polynesia